A subject is a being who has a unique consciousness and/or unique personal experiences, or an entity that has a relationship with another entity that exists outside itself (called an "object").

A subject is an observer and an object is a thing observed. This concept is especially important in Continental philosophy, where 'the subject' is a central term in debates over the nature of the self. The nature of the subject is also central in debates over the nature of subjective experience within the Anglo-American tradition of analytical philosophy.

The sharp distinction between subject and object corresponds to the distinction, in the philosophy of René Descartes, between thought and extension. Descartes believed that thought (subjectivity) was the essence of the mind, and that extension (the occupation of space) was the essence of matter.

German idealism
Subject as a key-term in thinking about human consciousness began its career with the German idealists, in response to David Hume's radical skepticism. The idealists' starting point is Hume's conclusion that there is nothing to the self over and above a big, fleeting bundle of perceptions. The next step was to ask how this undifferentiated bundle comes to be experienced as a unity – as a single subject. Hume had offered the following proposal:

"...the imagination must by long custom acquire the same method of thinking, and run along the parts of space and time in conceiving its objects.

Kant, Hegel and their successors sought to flesh out the process by which the subject is constituted out of the flow of sense impressions. Hegel, for example, stated in his Preface to the Phenomenology of Spirit that a subject is constituted by "the process of reflectively mediating itself with itself."

Hegel begins his definition of the subject at a standpoint derived from Aristotelian physics: "the unmoved which is also self-moving" (Preface, para. 22). That is, what is not moved by an outside force, but which propels itself, has a prima facie case for subjectivity. Hegel's next step, however, is to identify this power to move, this unrest that is the subject, as pure negativity. Subjective self-motion, for Hegel, comes not from any pure or simple kernel of authentic individuality, but rather, it is

"...the bifurcation of the simple; it is the doubling which sets up opposition, and then again the negation of this indifferent diversity and of its anti-thesis" (Preface, para. 18).

The Hegelian subject's modus operandi is therefore cutting, splitting and introducing distinctions by injecting negation into the flow of sense-perceptions. Subjectivity is thus a kind of structural effect – what happens when Nature is diffused, refracted around a field of negativity and the "unity of the subject" for Hegel, is in fact a second-order effect, a "negation of negation". The subject experiences itself as a unity only by purposively negating the very diversity it itself had produced. The Hegelian subject may therefore be characterized either as "self-restoring sameness" or else as "reflection in otherness within itself" (Preface, para. 18).

Continental philosophy

The thinking of Karl Marx and Sigmund Freud provided a point of departure for questioning the notion of a unitary, autonomous Subject, which for many thinkers in the Continental tradition is seen as the foundation of the liberal theory of the social contract. These thinkers opened up the way for the deconstruction of the subject as a core-concept of metaphysics.

Freud's explorations of the unconscious mind added up to a wholesale indictment of Enlightenment notions of subjectivity.

Among the most radical re-thinkers of human self-consciousness was Martin Heidegger, whose concept of Dasein or "Being-there" displaces traditional notions of the personal subject altogether. With Heidegger, phenomenology tries to go beyond the classical dichotomy between subject and object, because they are linked by an inseparable and original relationship, in the sense that there can be no world without a subject, nor the subject without world.

Jacques Lacan, inspired by Heidegger and Ferdinand de Saussure, built on Freud's psychoanalytic model of the subject, in which the split subject is constituted by a double bind: alienated from jouissance when they leave the Real, enters into the Imaginary (during the mirror stage), and separates from the Other when they come into the realm of language, difference, and demand in the Symbolic or the Name of the Father.

Thinkers such as structural Marxist Louis Althusser and poststructuralist Michel Foucault theorize the subject as a social construction, the so-called "poststructuralist subject". According to Althusser, the "subject" is an ideological construction (more exactly, constructed by the "Ideological State Apparatuses"). One's subjectivity exists, "always-already" and is discovered through the process of interpellation. Ideology inaugurates one into being a subject, and every ideology is intended to maintain and glorify its idealized subject, as well as the metaphysical category of the subject itself (see antihumanism).

According to Foucault, it is the "effect" of power and "disciplines" (see Discipline and Punish: construction of the subject (subjectivation or subjectification) as student, soldier, "criminal", etc.)). Foucault believed it was possible to transform oneself; he used the word ethopoiein from the word ethos to describe the process. Subjectification was a central concept in Gilles Deleuze and Félix Guattari's work as well.

Analytic philosophy
In contemporary analytic philosophy, the issue of subject—and more specifically the "point of view" of the subject, or "subjectivity"—has received attention as one of the major intractable problems in philosophy of mind (a related issue being the mind–body problem). In the essay "What Is It Like to Be a Bat?", Thomas Nagel famously argued that explaining subjective experience—the "what it is like" to be something—is currently beyond the reach of scientific inquiry, because scientific understanding by definition requires an objective perspective, which, according to Nagel, is diametrically opposed to the subjective first-person point of view. Furthermore, one cannot have a definition of objectivity without being connected to subjectivity in the first place since they are mutual and interlocked.

In Nagel's book The View from Nowhere, he asks: "What kind of fact is it that I am Thomas Nagel?". Subjects have a perspective but each subject has a unique perspective and this seems to be a fact in Nagel's view from nowhere (i.e. the birds-eye view of the objective description in the universe). The Indian view of "Brahman" suggests that the ultimate and fundamental subject is existence itself, through which each of us as it were "looks out" as an aspect of a frozen and timeless everything, experienced subjectively due to our separated sensory and memory apparatuses. These additional features of subjective experience are often referred to as qualia (see Frank Cameron Jackson and Mary's room).

See also

Philosophers

Notes

Bibliography
 
 Alain de Libera, "When Did the Modern Subject Emerge?", American Catholic Philosophical Quarterly, Vol. 82, No. 2, 2008, pp. 181–220.
 Robert B. Pippin, The Persistence of Subjectivity. On the Kantian Aftermath, Cambridge: Cambridge University Press, 2005.
 Udo Thiel, The Early Modern Subject. Self-Consciousness and Personal Identity from Descartes to Hume, New York: Oxford University Press, 2011.

External links
 
 Wiebke Wiede: Subjectification, the Subject, and the Self, in: Docupedia Zeitgeschichte, 15/12/2020

Concepts in metaphysics
Consciousness
Dichotomies
Subjective experience

ja:主体と客体